Will Bolt (born 1979) is an American baseball coach and former shortstop, who is the current head baseball coach at the Nebraska Cornhuskers. He played college baseball at Nebraska for coach Dave Van Horn from 1999 to 2002. He then served as the head coach of the Texarkana Bulldogs (2008–2011).

Playing career
Bolt attended Conroe High School in Conroe, Texas. He then enrolled at the University of Nebraska–Lincoln, to play college baseball for the Cornhuskers.

Career statistics

Coaching career
Bolt began his college coaching career as a volunteer assistant for Nebraska in 2005, helping guide the team to the 2005 College World Series. He served as a volunteer assistant for Texas A&M during the 2006 and 2007 seasons. Bolt then was hired as the head coach of Texarkana College.

In 2012, Bolt joined Darin Erstad's staff at Nebraska. In the fall of 2014, Bolt joined Rob Childress' staff at Texas A&M. Childress was an assistant at Nebraska during Bolt's playing career.

On June 14, 2019, Bolt was named the head coach of the Cornhuskers.

On May 30, 2021, Bolt was named Big Ten Coach of the Year.

Head coaching record

See also
 List of current NCAA Division I baseball coaches

References

External links
Nebraska Cornhuskers bio

Living people
1979 births
Baseball shortstops
Nebraska Cornhuskers baseball players
Nebraska Cornhuskers baseball coaches
Texas A&M Aggies baseball coaches
Texarkana Bulldogs baseball coaches
Baseball coaches from Texas
Conroe High School alumni